Now I'm Nailed to Your Bedroom Wall, I've Only Got Myself to Blame is a compilation album by London-based glam rockers Rachel Stamp. It was released in April 2009 via Serena/Cargo Records.  The album takes its name from the lyrics of the Rachel Stamp song, "Pink Skab".

The Album 
Released April 27, 2009 on CD & Digital Download (SRCD 9001)

Track listing 
The tracks chosen for the compilation were selected by David Ryder-Prangley. The album was mixed, edited and mastered by Drew Richards with sleeve notes written by Simon Price.
Originally, the album was to be released with a bonus DVD, but after reviewing the material, the band have decided to release the DVD separately later this year.
The album features many rare tracks such as "Dead Girl" (which was only available on a free CD given away with Kerrang! magazine and the band's Sweet Shop compilation CD) and "Every Night I Pray for the Bomb" (which was only available on the "Bring Me the Head of Rachel Stamp EP")

CD version 
 Black Cherry (album version)
 Queen of the Universe
 Dead Girl
 Hey Hey Michael You're Really Fantastic (single edit)
 My Sweet Rose (single version)
 I Like Girlz
 I Got the Worm
 Do Me In Once and I'll Be Sad, Do Me In Twice and I'll Know Better (radio edit)
 Black Tambourine
 Monsters of the New Wave
 True Love
 Twisted
 Les Oceans De Venus
 I Wanna Be Your Doll
 Every Night I Pray for the Bomb
 Pink Skab
 Jet Black Supersonic
 Stealing Clothes From Shelley Barrett
 Witches of Angelholm
 Didn't I Break My Heart Over You (radio edit)

Digital download 
The digital download version of the album replaces "Hey Hey Michael You're Really Fantastic" and "Every Night I Pray for the Bomb" with "Home Made Sex Change" and "Creeps". "Home Made Sex Change" was given away as a free download on the band's official website in 2002 and "Creeps" was available as a free track on a Metal Hammer compilation CD, given away with a copy of the magazine in November, 2004.

 Black Cherry (album version)
 Queen of the Universe
 Dead Girl
 My Sweet Rose (single version)
 I Like Girlz
 I Got the Worm
 Do Me In Once and I'll Be Sad, Do Me In Twice and I'll Know Better (radio edit)
 Black Tambourine
 Monsters of the New Wave
 True Love
 Twisted
 Les Oceans De Venus
 I Wanna Be Your Doll
 Pink Skab
 Jet Black Supersonic
 Stealing Clothes from Shelley Barrett
 Witches of Angelholm
 Didn't I Break My Heart Over You (radio edit)
 Home Made Sex Change
 Creeps

Production and promotions 
To promote the release, Rachel Stamp reformed for a sold out, one off show at the O2 Islington Academy, London on April 10, 2009.

References 

Rachel Stamp albums
2009 compilation albums